Cultrichthys compressocorpus is a species of cyprinid fish that is only found in Xinkaihu Lake and Jinbohu Lake in China.  It is the only member of its genus.

References

Cultrinae
Monotypic fish genera
Cyprinid fish of Asia
Freshwater fish of China
Fish described in 1959